Midnight Lady Called the Blues is an album by the American musician Jimmy Witherspoon, released in 1986. It was recorded shortly after Witherspoon recovered from throat cancer. Midnight Lady Called the Blues was dedicated to Big Joe Turner.

The album was nominated for a Grammy Award, in the "Best Jazz Vocal Performance, Male" category.

Production
The album was cowritten and coproduced by Doc Pomus and Dr. John; it was allegedly recorded in eight hours. It was the first time that Witherspoon had songs written explicitly for him. Hank Crawford played saxophone on the album. Bernard Purdie played drums.

Critical reception

The Miami Herald determined that, "while Witherspoon is responsible for the blues vibrations in the studio, every musician shines in support." The Washington Post called Midnight Lady Sings the Blues "one of the grittiest R&B albums he's ever made." Cash Box deemed it "a saucy, creamy, steamy LP."

AllMusic wrote that "the spirited set has more than its share of interesting and exciting moments despite the obscurity of the material." The Guardian noted that the album "gave [Witherspoon's] admirers almost unalloyed satisfaction, thanks partly to sympathetic collaborators, but chiefly to his sheer professionalism." MusicHound Blues: The Essential Album Guide dismissed it as "bland, uninspired."

Track listing

References

Jimmy Witherspoon albums
1986 albums
Muse Records albums